Columbus Saints Drum and Bugle Corps  is an all-age drum and bugle corps based in Columbus, Ohio. The corps is a member of Drum Corps Associates (DCA), and also competes in Drum Corps International All-Age Class.

History 
Founded as the Saints Drumline in 2003  by Marshall Cheatham; a social worker, and juvenile corrections officer, the corps began as an after-school musical outlet for kids. In 2012, the drumline expanded into a drum and bugle corps using a stock of G major bugles.

The corps partnered with the Boys & Girls Club of Columbus in 2014 to provide free music programs for club members in the Franklinton neighborhood. The "BOOM" performance ensemble resulted from this partnership.

The Saints completed a one-year residency at Flex High School, a charter school supported by the United Way of Central Ohio, in 2017. The residency allowed the corps to offer performance opportunities to students. Later that year, the corps applied to compete as a member of Drum Corps Associates (DCA). After an evaluation by DCA board members, the corps was approved for competition in Class A in June 2018.

Beginning in 2019, the Columbus Saints was approved for competition in Drum Corps International's All Age Division, which allows the corps to perform at a greater number of shows closer to Ohio, where DCA adjudicated shows are scarce due to the geographic location of the majority of DCA member corps. During the spring of 2019, the Columbus Saints equipment trailer was stolen, and with the assistance of local news, politicians, and law enforcement was recovered enabling the corps to continue its 2019 season.

As part of the 2021 non-competitive DCI season, the Saints performed at DCI shows, including the Indianapolis celebration, and livestreams.

About 
The corps is sponsored by the Saints Performing Arts, Inc., a 501(c)(3) organization. Marshall Cheatham is the founder and CEO, and the LeRon Carlton is executive director of the Saints's programs including the corps.

Mission and traditions 
The corps' mission is "inspiring teamwork, discipline, and respect through the performing arts, in our Central Ohio community." The corps recites the "Saint's creed" to build morale and camaraderie prior to performances.

Show Summary (2014–21) 
Pale blue background indicates DCA Finalist.

Gallery

References

External links 
 
 

Non-profit organizations based in Ohio
Musical groups from Ohio
Organizations based in Columbus, Ohio
Musical groups from Columbus, Ohio
Culture of Columbus, Ohio
Small Drum Corps Association corps
Youth organizations based in Ohio
Musical groups established in 2003
2003 establishments in Ohio